Fernando Alvarez may refer to:

Arts and entertainment 
 Fernando Álvarez de Sotomayor y Zaragoza (1875–1960), Galician painter
 Fernando Luis Alvarez, American gallerist and art activist

Politicians
 Fernando Álvarez de Toledo, 3rd Duke of Alba (1507–1582), Spanish noble, officer and diplomat
 Fernando Álvarez Monje (born 1968), Mexican politician
 Fernando Alvarez (economist), Argentine macroeconomist

Sportspeople
 Fernando Álvarez (footballer, born 1925), Filipino footballer, football manager and referee
 Fernando Álvarez (footballer, born 2003)
 Fernando Alvarez (jockey) (1937–1999), American Thoroughbred horse racing jockey and trainer
 Fernando Álvarez Ortiz de Urbina, Spanish Paralympic sailor